Gauriprasanna Majumdar (1925–1986) was an Indian lyricist and writer, known for his work in Indian cinema and Bangladeshi Cinema . He is most commonly associated with the black and white era of Bengali cinema, when he penned several enduring classics for films. He won the Bengal Film Journalists' Association Awards for best lyricist for Swaralipi (1962), Palatak (1964), Anthony Firingee (1968), Bon Palashir Padabali (1974), Sanyasi Raja (1976) and Anurager Chhoan (1987, posthumously). He also won National Film Awards of Bangladesh for Sesh Porjonto (1969).

Career
Majumdar was a contemporary of Nachiketa Ghosh, Robin Chattopadhyay, Hemanta Mukherjee, Uttam Kumar, and Kishore Kumar, and worked extensively with R D Burman and Kishore Kumar, Manna De.

His works include Mago Vabna keno, .Calcuttaweb – Bengali Songs – Kishore Kumar 

Legacy
On 12 February 2011, the 25th anniversary of his death, a musical evening was organized to pay tribute, held at Nazrul Mancha, Kolkata. Lopamudra, Shaan, Bappi Lahiri, Srikanta Acharya, and Arati Mukherjee among others were in attendance. Sovan Chatterjee, the mayor of Kolkata along with Satabdi Roy and Debasish Kumar MMIC, set the ball rolling for the evening. In October 2012 he was awarded the prestigious Bangladesh Mukti Yoddha Sammanana Trophy (posthumously) by the Honourable Prime Minister of Bangladesh for his famous composition "Shono Ekti Mujiburer Theke..." and "Mago Vabna Keno....''" which became the anthem for Bangladesh War of Liberation in 1971.

External links

References

1924 births
1986 deaths
Bengali-language lyricists
Bangladeshi music